Oscar Albarado (September 15, 1948 – February 17, 2021) was an American former professional boxer who held the undisputed light middleweight world championship from June 1974 to January 1975.

Professional career 
Known as "Shotgun", Albarado turned pro in 1966 and captured the undisputed light middleweight championship when he upset Koichi Wajima by KO in 1974. He defended the crown once before losing it in a rematch to Wajima in 1975 by decision. He retired after the loss.

Comeback 
Albarado launched an unsuccessful comeback five years later, retiring in 1982 after several losses.

Death
Albarado died on February 17, 2021, in Uvalde Texas at Amistad Nursing home at the age of 72.

Professional boxing record

See also
List of world light-middleweight boxing champions

References

External links

 Oscar "Shotgun" Albarado - CBZ Profile

 

|-

|-

1948 births
2021 deaths
American male boxers
Boxers from Texas
People from Pecos, Texas
American boxers of Mexican descent
World Boxing Association champions
World Boxing Council champions
The Ring (magazine) champions
Light-middleweight boxers
World light-middleweight boxing champions